The 2007–08 season was Real Madrid Club de Fútbol's 77th season in La Liga. This article lists all matches that the club played in the 2007–08 season, and also shows statistics of the club's players. Bwin.com became the new kit sponsor.

Players

Squad information

Transfers

In

Total spending:  €119 million

Out

Total income:  €37.8 million
{|

Club

Technical staff

Kits

|
|
|
|

† Only used against Alicante CF during Copa del Rey round of 32 first leg.

Other information

Competitions

La Liga

League table

Results by round

Matches

Champions League

Group C

Round of 16

Copa del Rey

Round of 32

Round of 16

Supercopa de España

Friendlies

Russian Railways Cup

Teresa Herrera Trophy

Trofeo Ramón de Carranza

Trofeo Santiago Bernabéu

Majed Abdullah retiring festival

Statistics

Squad stats

Disciplinary record

See also
2007–08 La Liga
2007–08 Copa del Rey
2007–08 UEFA Champions League

References

Real Madrid
Real Madrid CF seasons
Spanish football championship-winning seasons